The Loft were a British indie band, whose debut single was one of the earliest releases on Creation Records.

History 
Formed in 1980 as The Living Room by Peter Astor (vocals, guitar), Bill Prince (bass), Andy Strickland (guitar) and Dave Morgan (drums), the band changed its name when they discovered a local music venue also called The Living Room.  The venue was being run by Alan McGee, with whom The Loft struck up a friendship and played several gigs for. After signing to McGee's fledgling Creation Records label, the debut single "Why Does the Rain?" was issued in 1984. "Up the Hill and Down the Slope" was issued the following year, earning both band and label some critical success.

A national tour as the opening act for The Colourfield was intended to give the band further exposure, but tensions within the band led to a sensational split live onstage of the Hammersmith Palais, on the final date of the tour.

After the split 
Almost immediately, Peter Astor and Dave Morgan formed a new band, The Weather Prophets, who were also signed to Creation. In 1989, Creation finally issued a compilation of their work entitled Once Around the Fair: The Loft 1982-1985, with Magpie Eyes 1982-1985 appearing on Rev-Ola in 2005. Guitarist Strickland became a music journalist and formed The Caretaker Race, and Prince formed The Wishing Stones.

In 2006, the band unexpectedly reformed, playing a handful of gigs and releasing a single of new material on Static Caravan Recordings.

The band continues to perform occasionally. In 2015, to celebrate 30 years since their "Up The Hill and Down the Slope" single topped the indie chart, the band played shows in New York in May (headlining the NY Popfest in Brooklyn) and in London in June, before recording their third BBC radio session - this time for fan and supporter, Gideon Coe, on BBC 6 Music.

The Loft is featured heavily on the Creation Artefact CD compilation released by Cherry Red Records in September 2015.

The band remains open to further shows and recordings.

Discography

Singles
"Why Does the Rain?" (Creation, 1984)
"Up the Hill and Down the Slope" (Creation, 1985)
"Model Village" (Static Caravan, 2006)

Compilation albums
Once Around the Fair: The Loft 1982-1985 (Creation, 1989)
Magpie Eyes 1982-1985 (Rev-Ola, 2005)

See also
The Weather Prophets

References

External links
 Official site

British indie pop groups
Jangle pop groups
Creation Records artists